Gervais Clovis Gindre (3 August 1927 – 17 June 1990) was a French cross-country skier who competed in the 1950s. He finished 29th in the 50 km event at the 1952 Winter Olympics in Oslo.

References

External links
Olympic 50 km cross country skiing results: 1948-64

Olympic cross-country skiers of France
Cross-country skiers at the 1952 Winter Olympics
French male cross-country skiers
1990 deaths
1927 births